The Healers: The Last Chapter is a sixth studio album by South African house duo Black Motion, released on  September 24, 2020 by Spirit Motion.  It features Simmy, TRESOR, Msaki, Sauti Sol, Mo-T and others as guest artists.

The album won Best Dance Album at the 27th South African Music Awards.

Title 
The name "The Healers: The Last Chapter" refers to the celebration  of 10 years since their formation  in 2010.

Promotion and release 
The Healers: The Last Chapter was released on September 24, 2020. The album was revealed  in August 2020 and pre-add were made available.

"Marry Me" featuring South African singer Msaki was released in  August 2020.

To promote the album the house duo partnered  with Red Bull Rendezvous and re-recorded live The Healers: The Last Chapter at Three Rondavels, Graskop, Mpumalanga.

Accolades 
The Healers: The Last Chapter was nominated for Album of the Year and won Best Dance Album at the 27th South African Music Awards. 

|-
|rowspan="2"|2021
|rowspan="2"|The Healers: The Last Chapter
| Album of the Year 
|
|-
| Best Dance Album 
|

Track listing

Release history

References 

 2020 albums